Take Me Home is a British television drama series that originally aired from 2–16 May 1989. The 3-part mini-series starred Keith Barron, Maggie O'Neill, Reece Dinsdale, and Annette Crosbie. It was created and written by Tony Marchant and was shown in three episodes on BBC One. The lead character, Kathy, was one of the first television roles for actress Maggie O'Neill.

Kathy is a lonely young woman who moved to an extended Midlands town. The fictional industrial town is experiencing major transformation, including residential development, roads, and an advanced computer technology centre (relevant to the era of the broadcast). Kathy encounters a local taxi driver, Tom, who is driven by his passion for engineering and the infusion of technology in the town. Kathy and Tom begin to meet secretly, behind their respective partners' backs.

Their obsessive affair plays out over a backdrop of the social and economic changes of the 1980s in "Thatcherite" Britain. Take Me Home has many scripted references to actual changes in society at the time: notably, the technology encroachments upon industry and skilled labour. Scenes were shot in semi-developed housing estates and corporate business parks. Kathy's husband, Martin (Dinsdale), is written as a progressive computer expert, determined to outstride his corporate peers and succeed whatever the cost. He forces Kathy to have an abortion in the first episode because he feels a baby would harm his career. His colleagues at "InfoCo" are shown as pompous, arrogant, and chauvinistic.

Tom's home life and marriage with his ditzy wife Liz (Crosbie) is safe, stale, and old-fashioned. They live in a comfortable 1950s council semi. Kathy is needy but attracts Tom through her vibrance and intelligence. He quickly falls in love with her after they finally make love in the back of Tom's taxi. Meanwhile, Martin tries desperately to integrate the couple into their new surroundings. He arranges badminton matches with his colleagues and a dinner party at their exclusive new estate. Tom and Kathy's relationship deteriorates, however, as Kathy shows second thoughts about the affair. The affair ends in the last episode when both Liz and Martin discover their spouses' infidelity.

Take Me Home was shot entirely in the Shropshire town of Telford, which itself would have been considered a new town in the 1960s, growing and experiencing massive technological and economic changes, much as  the town depicted in the series.

Trivia

Tom's character is a fan of Dusty Springfield, and the soundtrack regularly features her recordings. Songs used include "The Look of Love," "Goin' Back," "I Just Don't Know What to Do with Myself" (which closes the final episode), "Wishin' and Hopin'," and "I Only Want to Be with You." In contrast, Kathy is a fan of Deacon Blue and their song "The Very Thing" is also frequently heard, including over the closing credits of episodes one and two.

References

External links

BBC television dramas
1989 British television series debuts
1989 British television series endings
1980s British drama television series
1980s British television miniseries
English-language television shows
Television shows set in Shropshire